This is a list of the highest summits in the Arab world.

Summits

References 

Arab world
Mountains
Mountains